The videography of South Korean pop group TVXQ, known as Tohoshinki in Japan, consists of 77 music videos, 14 concert tour videos, 10 documentary DVDs, one music video compilation, eight photo albums, and six storybooks. TVXQ originally debuted as a five-piece boy band under S.M. Entertainment in December 2003. In 2004, the band signed with Japan's Avex sub-label Rhythm Zone and released their debut Japanese single, "Stay with Me Tonight" in April 2005. In July 2009, three of the members – later known as JYJ – left the group's Korean agency S.M. Entertainment, and TVXQ returned as a duo act with remaining members U-Know Yunho and Max Changmin in 2011.

Music videos

2000s

2010s

Notes
1 – A separate music video for the Japanese version was officially released.
2 – A separate music video for the Korean version was officially released.
3 – A separate music video for the English version was officially released.
4 – An alternate version of the music video was officially released.
5 – A music video featuring footage from a concert tour.
6 – A music video to promote a DVD release.
7 – A music video for a soundtrack.
8 – Separate dance version(s) was filmed.

Video albums

Concert tour videos

Documentaries

Music video compilations

Other releases

Featured releases

Others

Photo albums

Storybooks

See also
TVXQ discography
List of songs by TVXQ
List of awards and nominations received by TVXQ

References

Videography
Videographies of South Korean artists